Stoneleigh railway station is in the Epsom and Ewell district of Surrey, England. The station is served by South Western Railway and is currently in Travelcard Zone 5 (because of its proximity to the Greater London boundary); it is the only National Rail station in zone 5 not to be located in a London borough.

Description 

The station was opened in 1932 and is built in the utilitarian concrete style of the 1930s. It has an island platform with the ticket office in the overbridge opposite the platform entrance steps.

Access to the station is from either side of the line, the east side from Stoneleigh Broadway, and the west side from Station Approach, off Stoneleigh Park Road. In 2013, the platform was extended so that ten-carriage trains can stop at the station. This opened in late 2014.

During the 1980s-1990s the station won many awards for "Best Station" due to its well kept flower beds set between the platforms.

Services
All services at Stoneleigh are operated by South Western Railway using  EMUs.

Until 2022, Class 456 trains were often attached to Class 455 units to form ten carriage trains, but these were withdrawn on 17 January with the introduction of a new timetable.

The typical off-peak service in trains per hour is:
 2 tph to  via 
 1 tph to 
 1 tph to 

The same service is provided on Sundays and bank holidays.

References

External links

Railway stations in Surrey
Transport in Epsom and Ewell
Former Southern Railway (UK) stations
Railway stations in Great Britain opened in 1932
Railway stations served by South Western Railway